†Cylindrellinidae is an extinct family of air-breathing land snails, terrestrial pulmonate gastropod mollusks.

Taxonomy 
The family Cylindrellinidae is classified within the informal group Orthurethra, itself belonging to the clade Stylommatophora within the clade Eupulmonata (according to the taxonomy of the Gastropoda by Bouchet & Rocroi, 2005).

Genera 
 † Cylindrellina Munier-Chalmas, 1884 
 †Fascinella Stache, 1871 
 † Paradistoechia Cossmann, 1924 
Synonyms
 † Distoechia Crosse, 1890 : synonym of † Cylindrellina Munier-Chalmas, 1884 (junior subjective synonym)

References

 Zilch, A. (1959-1960). Teil 2: Euthyneura. In: O. H. Schindewolf, ed., Handbuch der Paläozoologie, Band 6, Gastropoda . Borntraeger, Berlin. xii + 835